The Lord High Treasurer of Ireland was the head of the Exchequer of Ireland, and chief financial officer of the Kingdom of Ireland. The designation High was added in 1695.

After the Acts of Union 1800 created the United Kingdom of Great Britain and Ireland, the Consolidated Fund Act 1816 merged the Irish Inferior Exchequer into the British Treasury with effect from 1817.

The act also mandated that the post of Lord High Treasurer of Ireland could only be held together with the post of Treasurer of the Exchequer, with the person holding both being Lord High Treasurer. If no person is appointed to the combined positions, then the Lord High Treasurer of Ireland is placed in commission and represented by the Lords Commissioners of the Treasury, as has been the case continuously since 1816.

The Superior Irish Exchequer, or Court of Exchequer, remained, led by the Chief Baron of the Irish Exchequer.

Lord Treasurers of Ireland 1217–1695
1217–1232: John de St John, Bishop of Ferns
1232–1233: Peter de Rivaux
1233–1235: Eustace, Canon of Chichester
1235–1250: Geoffrey de Turville, Bishop of Ossory
1251–1258: Hugh de Mapilton, Bishop of Ossory
1258–1274: Hugh de Tachmon, or Taghmon, Bishop of Meath
1274–1277: Stephen de Fulbourn, Bishop of Waterford
1277–1278: Robert de Poer
1278–1281: Stephen de Fulbourn
1281–1289: Hugh, Bishop of Meath
1289–1294: Nicholas de Clere, or le Clerk 
1294–1300: Sir William de Essendon, also called de Estdene or Eastdene
1300–1304: Richard de Beresford
1304–1305: Sir William de Essendon, also called de Estdene or Eastdene
1305–1307: Richard de Beresford
1307–1312: Alexander de Bicknor
1312–1315: John de Leche
1315–1316:Walter de Islip
1316–1317: John de Hotham
1317–1325:Walter de Islip
1325–1326: Adam de Harvington 
1326:Walter de Islip
1326–1330: Robert FitzEustace
1330–1332:Robert le Poer
1332–1334: Sir Thomas de Burgh
1334–1336: William de Cogan
1336–1337: Sir John Ellitker
1337–1340: John ap Rees/Rice
1340–1344: Hugh de Burgh
1344–1348: John de Burnham, Canon of St Patrick's Cathedral, Dublin
1348–1349:Robert de Emeldon
1349-1350: Nicholas Allen, Abbot  of  St Thomas the  Martyr,  later  Bishop  of Meath 
1350–1354: Hugh de Burgh
1354–1356: William de Bromley
1356–1357: John Colton, Dean of St Patrick's Cathedral, Dublin and later Archbishop of Armagh
1357–1361: Nicholas Allen, Bishop of Meath
1361–1362: William Chernels, Bishop of Ferns
1362–1364: Thomas Minot, Prior of Mulhuddart and later Archbishop of Dublin
1364–1371: John de Troye, Chancellor of St Patrick's Cathedral 
1371–1372: Stephen de Valle, or Wall, Bishop of Meath
1372–1374: Alexander de Balscot, Bishop of Ossory
1374–1375: John Colton second term
1375–1376: Thomas Scurlock, Abbot of St Thomas's, Dublin
1376–1385: Alexander de Balscot, Bishop of Ossory
1385–1386: William de Chambre, Archdeacon of Dublin
1386–1388: Robert Crick
1388–1392: Richard White, Prior of Kilmainham
1392–1393: Richard Mitford, Bishop of Chichester
1393–1394: John de Thorpe
1394–1395: Richard Mitford, Bishop of Chichester
1395–1396: Stephen, Abbot of St Mary's Abbey, Dublin
1396–1397: William Baltham
1397–1398: Richard Mitford, Bishop of Salisbury
1398–1399: Richard Macclesfield
1399–1400: Robert de Faryngton, or de Farrington
1400–1402: Thomas Bache,  Archdeacon of Meath
1402–1409: Sir Laurence Merbury
1409–1412: Sir William Alington,  later  Treasurer of Normandy and Speaker of the House of Commons of England (1429)
1412–1413: Sir Laurence Merbury
1413–1414: Hugh de Burgh
1414–1415: John Coryngham
1415–1417: Hugh de Burgh
1417–1421: John Swift
1421: Sir Thomas Strange
1421–1424: William Tynbegh
1424–1426: Hugh Banent
1426: Edward Dantsey, Bishop of Meath
1426–1427: John Blackston
1427–1429: Sir Nicholas Plunket
1429: Thomas de Barry, Bishop of Ossory
1429: Sir Nicholas Plunket
1429–1430: Thomas Scurlock, Prior of St Peter's, near Trim
1430–1437: Sir Thomas Strange
1437–1444: Giles Thorndon
1444–1445: William Chevir or Cheevers
1445–1446: Robert Dyke, Archdeacon of Dublin
1446–1450: Giles Thorndon
1450–1452: John Blackston
1452–1454: Sir Henry Bruin
1454–1492: Sir Rowland FitzEustace (with Sir John Wenlock 1461–1471)
1492–1494: Sir James Ormond
1494–1504: Sir Hugh Conway
1504–1514: Gerald FitzGerald
1514–1517: Christopher Fleming, 8th Baron Slane
1517–1524: John Rawson, Prior of Kilmainham (later Viscount Clontarf)
1524–1530: John Barnewall, 3rd Baron Trimlestown
1530–1532: John Rawson, Prior of Kilmainham
1532–1540: James Butler, Lord Butler
1540–1542: James Butler
1542–1553: James FitzGerald, 14th/15th Earl of Desmond
1553: Sir Edmund Rouse
1553–1558: James FitzGerald, 14th/15th Earl of Desmond
1559–1614: Thomas Butler, 10th Earl of Ormonde
1616–1625: Arthur Chichester, 1st Baron Chichester
1625–1630: Oliver St John, 1st Viscount Grandison
1631–1643: Richard Boyle, 1st Earl of Cork
1643–1660: Interregnum
1660–1695: Richard Boyle, 2nd Earl of Cork

Lord High Treasurers of Ireland 1695–1793
Charles Boyle, 2nd Earl of Burlington 4 May 1695 – 9 February 1704
Henry Boyle, 1st Baron Carleton 5 May 1704 – 25 August 1715
Richard Boyle, 3rd Earl of Burlington 25 August 1715 – 3 December 1753
William Cavendish, 4th Duke of Devonshire 2 March 1754 – 2 October 1764
vacant
William Cavendish, 5th Duke of Devonshire 13 March 1766 – 1793

Commissioners of the Treasury for Ireland 1793–1817
1793: Commission.
Richard Boyle, 2nd Earl of Shannon
Sir John Parnell, 2nd Baronet
John Beresford
Sir Henry Cavendish, 2nd Baronet
William Burton Conyngham
Robert Hobart, Lord Hobart
1795: Commission.
Richard Boyle, 2nd Earl of Shannon
Sir John Parnell, 2nd Baronet
William Burton Conyngham
Hon. Thomas Pelham
John Monck Mason
1796: Commission.
Richard Boyle, 2nd Earl of Shannon
Sir John Parnell, 2nd Baronet
Hon. Thomas Pelham
John Monck Mason
Lodge Morris
1797: Commission.
Richard Boyle, 2nd Earl of Shannon
Isaac Corry
Hon. Thomas Pelham
John Monck Mason
Lodge Morris
Robert Stewart, Viscount Castlereagh
1800: Commission.
Richard Boyle, 2nd Earl of Shannon
Isaac Corry
Robert Stewart, Viscount Castlereagh
Lodge de Montmorency, 1st Baron Frankfort de Montmorency
John Loftus, Lord Loftus
William Wickham
Maurice FitzGerald
1801: Commission.
Richard Boyle, 2nd Earl of Shannon
Isaac Corry
Charles Abbot
Lodge de Montmorency, 1st Viscount Frankfort de Montmorency
John Loftus, Viscount Loftus
Maurice FitzGerald
1803: Commission.
Richard Boyle, 2nd Earl of Shannon
Isaac Corry
Lodge de Montmorency, 1st Viscount Frankfort de Montmorency
John Loftus, Viscount Loftus
Maurice FitzGerald
William Wickham
1804: Commission.
John Foster
Sir Evan Nepean, 1st Baronet
Lodge de Montmorency, 1st Viscount Frankfort de Montmorency
John Loftus, Viscount Loftus
Maurice FitzGerald
1804: Commission.
John Foster
Lodge de Montmorency, 1st Viscount Frankfort de Montmorency
John Loftus, Viscount Loftus
Maurice FitzGerald
Hon. George Knox
Nicholas Vansittart
1805: Commission.
John Foster
Lodge de Montmorency, 1st Viscount Frankfort de Montmorency
John Loftus, Viscount Loftus
Maurice FitzGerald
Hon. George Knox
Sir Laurence Parsons, 5th Baronet
Charles Long
1806: Commission.
William Grenville, 1st Baron Grenville
Sir John Newport, 1st Baronet
Maurice FitzGerald
Sir Laurence Parsons, 5th Baronet
Charles O'Hara
Henry Parnell
William Burton
William Elliot
1807: Commission
Laurence Parsons, 2nd Earl of Rosse
John Foster
Arthur Wellesley
Hon. Thomas Henry Foster
Sir George FitzGerald Hill, 2nd Baronet
John Maxwell-Barry
Charles Vereker
1810: Commission.
Hon. Spencer Perceval
John Foster
Hon. William Wellesley-Pole
Laurence Parsons, 2nd Earl of Rosse
Sir George FitzGerald Hill, 2nd Baronet
John Maxwell-Barry
Hon. Thomas Henry Foster
Charles Vereker
W. W. H. Guarden
1811: Commission.
Hon. Spencer Perceval
John Foster
Hon. William Wellesley-Pole
Laurence Parsons, 2nd Earl of Rosse
Sir George FitzGerald Hill, 2nd Baronet
John Maxwell-Barry
Hon. Thomas Henry Foster
Charles Vereker
William Odell
1812: Commission.
John Foster
Hon. William Wellesley-Pole
Sir George FitzGerald Hill, 2nd Baronet
John Maxwell-Barry
Hon. Thomas Henry Foster
Charles Vereker
William Odell
1813: Commission.
John Foster
Hon. William Wellesley-Pole
Sir George FitzGerald Hill, 2nd Baronet
John Maxwell-Barry
Hon. Thomas Henry Foster
Charles Vereker
William Odell
Henry John Clements
Edmund Alexander Macnaghten
1814: Commission:
Robert Jenkinson, 2nd Earl of Liverpool
William Vesey-FitzGerald
Robert Peel
Sir George FitzGerald Hill, 2nd Baronet
John Maxwell-Barry
William Odell
Henry John Clements
Edmond Alexander Macnaghten
1817: Board abolished the office of Lord High Treasurer of Ireland and placed into commission as Lords Commissioners of the Treasury.

Vice-Treasurers of Ireland
1430: Christopher Bernevall
1522–: John Barnewall, 3rd Baron Trimlestown
1523: William Darcy
c.1533: William Bathe
1534–1552: Sir William Brabazon
1551–?1553: Andrew Wise
c.1553–?1555 Sir Edmund Rous
1556–1559: Henry Sidney
1559–1571: William Fitzwilliam
1572–1579: Edward Fitton
1579–1582: Sir Henry Wallop
1582–1599: ?
1599–1603: Sir George Carey
1603–1606: Thomas Ridgeway, 1st Earl of Londonderry
1606–1622: ?
1622–1625: Sir Francis Blundell, 1st Baronet
1625–1636: Francis Annesley, 1st Viscount Valentia
1636–?1638: Adam Loftus, 1st Viscount Loftus (died 1643)
1649–1660: James Standish (Parliament)
1660 (August)–1667: Arthur Annesley, 1st Earl of Anglesey
1667–1670: George Carteret
1670–1673: Francis Lord Angier
1673–1674: Sir John Temple
1676–1682: Richard Jones, 1st Earl of Ranelagh
1682–1686: John Price (also Receiver General)
1686–?1689: Thomas Keightley
1689–1692: William Harbord
1692–1710: Thomas Coningsby, 1st Baron Coningsby
1710–1710 (September): John Annesley, 4th Earl of Anglesey
1710 (September)–1716: Arthur Annesley, 5th Earl of Anglesey
1717 (April–May): Matthew Moreton, 1st Baron Ducie
1717–1720: Matthew Moreton, 1st Baron Ducie (jointly)
?1717–1734: Hugh Boscawen (jointly)
1720–1723: Sir William St Quintin, 3rd Baronet (jointly)
1724–1742: Richard Edgcumbe (jointly)
1734–1746: Pattee Byng, 2nd Viscount Torrington (jointly)
1742–1744: Henry Vane (jointly)
1744–1757: George Cholmondeley, 3rd Earl of Cholmondeley (jointly)
1746–1755: Sir William Yonge (jointly)
1755 (December)–1762 (December): Welbore Ellis (jointly)
1757 (July)–1759: Thomas Potter (jointly)
1760–1765: (jointly) Robert Nugent, 1st Earl Nugent (jointly)
1762 (December)–1765 (July): Richard Rigby (jointly)
1763–1767: James Oswald (jointly)
1765 (December)–1766 (July): Lord George Sackville (jointly)
1766 (April)–1770 (January): James Grenville (jointly)
1766 (September)–1768 (October): Isaac Barré (jointly)
1768 (January–June): Richard Rigby (jointly)
1768 (July)–1782 (March): (jointly) Robert Nugent, 1st Earl Nugent (jointly)
1769–1770: Charles Cornwallis, Earl Cornwallis (jointly)
1770–1772: Hon. George Edgcumbe (jointly)
1770–1777: Welbore Ellis (jointly)
1773 (January)–1775 (October): Charles Jenkinson, 1st Earl of Liverpool (jointly)
1775–1781: Henry Flood (jointly)
1781–1789: Richard Boyle, 2nd Earl of Shannon
1782 (May–July): Lord Robert Spencer (jointly)
1782–1784: Lord Charles Spencer (jointly) 
1783 (April–December) William Eden, 1st Baron Auckland (jointly)
1784–1787: Thomas de Grey, 2nd Baron Walsingham (jointly)
1784–1793: Hon. George Edgcumbe (jointly)
1787–1793: Lord Frederick Campbell (jointly)

References

A Political Index to the Histories of Great Britain & Ireland (1806)
Haydn's Book of Dignities (1894)

1660 establishments in Ireland
1817 disestablishments
 
Political office-holders in pre-partition Ireland